The St. Helena white seabream (Diplodus helenae) is a species of seabream, a marine fish of the family Sparidae. The species was named by Henri Émile Sauvage in 1879.

Description
This benthopelagic fish grows to an average length of 20 cm, maximum 31 cm.

Distribution
The fish inhabits rocky bottoms in waters between 5 and 15 metres depth. It occurs in the southeastern Atlantic, off the coast of Saint Helena.

References

Further reading
 Eschmeyer, William N., ed. 1998. Catalog of Fishes. Special Publication of the Center for Biodiversity Research and Information, no. 1, vol. 1–3. California Academy of Sciences. San Francisco, California, USA. 2905. .
 Fenner, Robert M. The Conscientious Marine Aquarist. Neptune City, New Jersey, USA: T.F.H. Publications, 2001.
 Helfman, G., B. Collette and D. Facey: The diversity of fishes. Blackwell Science, Malden, Massachusetts, USA, 1997.
 Hoese, D.F. 1986. A M.M. Smith and P.C. Heemstra (eds.) Smiths' sea fishes. Springer-Verlag, Berlin, Germany
 Maugé, L.A. 1986. A J. Daget, J.-P. Gosse and D.F.E. Thys van den Audenaerde (eds.) Check-list of the freshwater fishes of Africa (CLOFFA). ISNB, Brussels; MRAC, Tervuren, Flanders; and ORSTOM, Paris, France, Vol. 2.
 Moyle, P. and J. Cech.: Fishes: An Introduction to Ichthyology, 4th ed., Upper Saddle River, New Jersey, USA: Prentice-Hall. 2000.
 Nelson, J.: Fishes of the World, 3rd ed.. New York, USA: John Wiley and Sons., 1994

Fauna of Saint Helena
Fish of the Atlantic Ocean
Fish described in 1879
Taxa named by Henri Émile Sauvage
Diplodus